Odd One In is a British panel show, broadcast on ITV. It is hosted by Bradley Walsh. The regular Home Team are Peter Andre and Jason Manford, the Away Team are two guest celebrities who change each week.

Format
In each round, the teams are presented with a lineup of people who all claim to have a particular unusual trait or skill (e.g. being able to hold their breath underwater for more than five minutes), but only one of them is telling the truth. The teams may ask questions of the lineup members in order to determine the truth-teller. At the end of the round, each team may make one guess as to which one is the "Odd One In," receiving one point for a correct choice. Where appropriate, the lineup members are invited to demonstrate their purported skill.

During the first series, the members in one section of the audience are given keypads on which to lock in their guesses as to the Odd One In. After the penultimate lineup has been played, the high scorer is invited to compete for a £5,000 cash prize by correctly spotting the final Odd One In, with help from the two teams and the rest of the audience.

The keypads and cash prize are eliminated for the second series. The final round is replaced with a "Familiar Faces" lineup, consisting of one or more members from each of the previous rounds; the teams must determine which is the Odd One in as before.

Episodes
The coloured backgrounds denote the result of each of the shows:
 – Indicates the Home Team won.
 – Indicates the Away Team won.
 – Indicates the game ended in a draw.

Episode viewing figures from BARB.

Series 1 (2010)

Series 2 (2011)

Specials

International versions 
The format was exported in Italy, Ukraine and Vietnam.

References

External links

Odd One In from Bradley Walsh's official website

2010s British game shows
2010 British television series debuts
2011 British television series endings
ITV game shows
ITV panel games
Peter Andre
Television series by Banijay
Television series by Zeppotron
Television shows shot at BBC Elstree Centre